Gerald Anthony Sadler (September 8, 1907 – February 25, 1982), was a Democratic politician from the U.S. state of Texas. He was a member of the Texas House of Representatives from 1955 to 1961, the Texas Railroad Commission from 1938 to 1942, and the Commissioner of the General Land Office from 1961 to 1971.

Early years

Sadler was born near Palestine in Anderson County in East Texas.  He served in the United States Army 12th Cavalry from 1927 to 1929 at Fort Brown in Brownsville in Cameron County, Texas.

Political career and wartime service

In 1938, Sadler was elected to the Texas Railroad Commission. Sadler resigned from the commission in 1942 to enter the U.S. Army once again. He served during World War II in the Persian Gulf command and was honorably discharged in 1945 at the rank of lieutenant colonel.
 
After the war, Sadler returned to Anderson County. In the 1946 gubernatorial election, Sadler ran for the Democratic nomination, but was defeated by his successor on the Railroad Commission, Beauford H. Jester of Corsicana in Navarro County.  He then was elected to the Texas House in 1954 (term 1/11/1955 - 1/8/1957).  He was twice re-elected, serving to January 10, 1961.

In Spring 1957 Sadler was apprised by an employee of the University of Texas at Austin that a young black woman, Barbara Smith Conrad, had been cast to sing the role of Dido in Henry Purcell's "Dido and Aeneas" at UT Austin.  At a legislator's breakfast, Mr. Sadler complained of the mixed-race casting, prompting another legislator, Joe Chapman, to telephone the president of the University, Logan Wilson, and threaten to withhold funding should Ms. Smith perform.  Mr. Wilson had her removed from the cast, provoking protests and national news coverage.  When interviewed by the Houston Post Mr. Sadler said of his breakfast remarks, "I mentioned appropriations and as a matter of fact [I] voted against those for the university because they have Negro undergraduates."    Ms. Smith graduated UT in 1959 and later gained international renown as an operatic star. 
 
After he represented Anderson County in the Texas House for six years, Sadler was elected in 1960 as the state Land Commissioner, a position that he held for a decade. In 1962, Sadler opposed Senator Ralph Yarborough's plans to create a National Seashore at South Padre Island. Sadler claimed that a National Seashore that took over state-owned tidelands would prohibit the removal of oil and natural gas and thus deprive Texas of millions of dollars in revenues that would otherwise contribute to the Permanent School Fund. Using emotionally charged phrases such as "summarily stripped of such great wealth," Commissioner Sadler persuaded Governor Price Daniel, Sr., to appoint a statewide committee to study the feasibility of a state park in place of the National Seashore.

Ultimately, the Padre Island National Seashore was designated. Ironically, Padre Island would provide the setting for the final phase of Sadler's tenure as Land Commissioner.  Starting in 1968, Sadler was involved with the Platoro company of Indiana, which was dredging along the Gulf Coast near South Padre Island and found the wreck of a Spanish galleon. Platoro kept the treasures, which were removed to Indiana.  When Sadler's name was linked to the company, he went on an offensive demanding accountings from the company, but his involvement became a brewing scandal.

In 1969, State Representative Jake Johnson of San Antonio held a press conference demanding the return of the Spanish treasure.  "At the conference, Sadler ended up holding Johnson in a choke hold as a radio reporter stuck a microphone in his face and asked him for comment. 'The land commissioner is choking me,' Johnson replied."

The following year, State Representative Bob Armstrong of Austin defeated Sadler in the Democratic primary and went on to hold that position for twelve years.

Sadler died in 1982. He was survived by his wife, the former Laura Jones (born August 24, 1920). He is like Armstrong interred at Texas State Cemetery in Austin.

References

1907 births
1982 deaths
United States Army officers
United States Army personnel of World War II
Democratic Party members of the Texas House of Representatives
Members of the Railroad Commission of Texas
Commissioners of the General Land Office of Texas
People from Anderson County, Texas
People from Austin, Texas
Burials at Texas State Cemetery
20th-century American politicians
Military personnel from Texas